Cool for August was a rock band consisting of notable Canadian singer-songwriter Shad Hills on guitar, Andrew Shives on bass, Gordon Vaughn on vocals, Trevor Kustiak on guitar, and Shane Hills on drums who was then replaced by Larry Voss in the spring of 2000. They made their television debut on Late Night with Conan O'Brien with their hit song "Trials".  While it was not their highest-charting single, "Walk Away" was considered their most accessible song and received its own single in stores.  The band resurfaced a few years later in 2001 (after long speculation that the band had broken up) with an online single "Say it isn't So".  The band added bandmate Chris Harris, guitar and violin, and completed a demo of six songs (produced by Jeff Tomei and Joey Huffman), about half of an anticipated upcoming album.  However, with no more support from Warner Brothers or any other major labels, the band called it quits.

With the disbanding of Cool for August in 2001, Gordon stepped back from the mainstream music scene. He is currently a freelance producer and artist. In 2003 he wrote, produced, and took lead vocals on the song, "Broken Hearts, Broken Lands" for the independent songwriting/producing firm Egg's Productions. He also produced a rap song, "Lucky Charm" for the same company.

Trevor Kustiak formed The Pocket Studios with Mike Turner (Our Lady Peace, Fair Ground, Crash Carma) and produced albums for Evans Blue and Rains.

In 2001 Drummer Shane Hills legally changed his name to Moon Hills.  He has recorded  over 100 records for international acts all over the world.
Moon was involved with Blacklist Union in 2006 through 2010 recording and touring on their breakthrough album After The Mourning as well as the follow up Breakin Bread With The Devil.

Larry Voss left the music industry and is now the founder and president of Universal Servo group. 

Cool for August reunited in summer of 2011. The band started recording their second album, but decided to part ways again without releasing any new material.

Discography

Albums

Singles

References
Footnotes

General references

Rock music groups from Georgia (U.S. state)
Musical groups established in 1993
Musical groups disestablished in 2001
Musical groups reestablished in 2011
1993 establishments in Georgia (U.S. state)
2001 disestablishments in Georgia (U.S. state)